Ma Liyun (born July 1, 1988, in Guangdong) is a female Chinese BMX racer, who competed for Team China at the 2008 Summer Olympics.

Ma won a gold medal in the women's BMX race at the 2010 Asian Games.

Sports career
2001 Nanxiong Xiongzhou Middle School Athletics Team (Sprint);
2004 Switched to BMX, Guangdong Provincial Cycling Team;
2005 National BMX Team for Intensified Training

Major performances
2006 BMX National Champions Tournament - 1st/3rd dirt race;
2006 BMX Pacific Oceania Ranking Series - 3rd dirt race;
2007 BMX National Champions Tournament - 1st/1st dirt race;
2007 BMX Asian Championships - 1st dirt race

References

External links
 
 
 

1988 births
Living people
BMX riders
Chinese female cyclists
Olympic cyclists of China
Cyclists at the 2008 Summer Olympics
Asian Games medalists in cycling
Asian Games gold medalists for China
Cyclists at the 2010 Asian Games
Medalists at the 2010 Asian Games
Sportspeople from Guangdong
21st-century Chinese women